Castlegar is the second-largest community in the West Kootenay region of British Columbia, Canada. In the Selkirk Mountains, at the confluence of the Kootenay and Columbia Rivers, it is a regional trade and transportation centre, with a local economy based on forestry, mining and tourism.

Castlegar is home to Selkirk College, a regional airport, a pulp mill, and several sawmills. Its population of 7,259 includes many Doukhobors, who were largely responsible for much of the town's early development and growth.

The area which became Castlegar was an important centre for the Sinixt (Lakes) Peoples. Outside the city limits are the small surrounding communities of Ootischenia, Brilliant, Robson, Robson West, Raspberry, Tarrys, Thrums, Glade, Shoreacres, Fairview, Genelle, Pass Creek and Krestova, and the much smaller communities of Deer Park, Renata, and Syringa on Lower Arrow Lake. These outlying areas have a further population of about 8,000 people.

History
On 5 September 1811, David Thompson arrived in the area of present-day Castlegar, and camped near the mouth of the Kootenay River. A plaque dedicated to him is on the east bank of the Columbia River overlooking the town.

The area's first settlement was West Waterloo, now known as South Castlegar. With widespread provincial interest in gold prospecting in the late 19th century, by 1895 there were 40 houses in Waterloo. The town boomed until the end of the century when interest in the local mines declined.

Castlegar takes its name from Castlegar, County Galway in Ireland (on the eastern boundary of the city of Galway), the ancestral home of townsite founder Edward Mahon. Castlegar, BC was planned in 1897. Around 1902, the Canadian Pacific Railway (CPR) built the bridge there and laid the wide-gauge railway tracks to Trail. They built a boxcar station at the old Waterloo Trail crossing and named it Kinnaird Station in honour of Lord Kinnaird, a CPR shareholder.

There was little in Castlegar until after the completion of the CPR bridge. A Mr. Farmer built the first store, housing both the post office and town hall. William Gage built the Castlegar Hotel in 1908, which stood until 1982 when it was destroyed by fire. Also in 1908, the first schoolhouse was built by a few local residents. A dance pavilion, garage, tourist cabins and a slaughterhouse were established by 1925.

On 30 October 1946, Castlegar was incorporated into a village; and in 1966, became a town. It amalgamated with neighbouring Kinnaird into a city on 1 January 1974, effectively doubling its population. On 20 May 2004, the city's boundary was extended to include the Blueberry Creek Irrigation District.

Indigenous peoples history

Castlegar is in the border area between the Sinixt (Interior Salish) and Ktunaxa Indian bands. Experts cannot agree where one band's range ended and the other's began, as there was much overlapping of cultural and territorial activity between them. Most recent information suggests that the Sinixt were the area's original people, and that the Kootenai arrived several hundred years ago from central Canada.

Kp'itl'els was an Indigenous settlement on the north side of the Kootenay River, just above the junction with the Columbia River. Implements such as arrowheads and pestles have been found along the nearby Arrow Lakes. A reconstructed kekuli dwelling was discovered on Zuckerberg Island, at the confluence of the Kootenay and Columbia rivers.

Doukhobor history

The Doukhobors operated a ferry near Brilliant on the Kootenay River in 1910, and the Christian Community of Universal Brotherhood (CCUB) applied to CPR for a railway station and siding to that point. Brilliant was the centre of the CCUB commercial enterprises, including the Brilliant Jam Factory, a grain elevator, and a flax mill.

Demographics

Population (2016): 9,023
Population (2011): 7,816
Population (2006): 7,259
Growth Rate: +7.7%
Total Private Dwellings: 3,349 
Population Density: 399.3 per km²
Area: 19.8 km²
Median Age: 46.1
Number of Immigrants: 725

Ethnicity

Language 
Mother Tongue:
English: 6,500
French: 65
Other: 1,010

Religion 
According to the 2021 census, religious groups in Castlegar included:
Irreligion (4,875 persons or 60.5%)
Christianity (2,855 persons or 35.4%)
Sikhism (115 persons or 1.4%)
Hinduism (65 persons or 0.8%)
Buddhism (40 persons or 0.5%)
Islam (30 persons or 0.4%)
Judaism (10 persons or 0.1%)
Other (70 persons or 0.9%)

Climate

Castlegar has a humid continental climate (Köppen Dfb) or an inland oceanic climate (Cfb), bordering an inland warm-summer mediterranean climate (Köppen Csb). Summers are warm and sunny, with late summer being quite dry, while winters are cool and frequently unsettled. Precipitation peaks in the winter months when the Aleutian Low is strongest, and a range of precipitation is experienced, sometimes in short time periods. Castlegar is wetter than most places in the Southern Interior of BC, and the city receives around 400 mm more precipitation than nearby Kelowna, Penticton and Kamloops (which are in the drier Okanagan region of British Columbia, while Castlegar is in the Kootenay region).

Airport

The West Kootenay Regional Airport is owned and operated by the City of Castlegar, and provides regular service to Vancouver International Airport and Calgary International Airport. The other nearest airport is Trail Airport,  to the south.

Schools

Castlegar is part of School District 20 Kootenay-Columbia. There are four elementary schools in the town:
 Castlegar Primary School
 Kinnaird Elementary School
 Robson Community School 
 Twin Rivers Elementary School

There is one high school, Stanley Humphries Secondary School.

Selkirk College's main campus is also in Castlegar.

Recreation
Dozens of walking trails in and near Castlegar are maintained by the Castlegar Parks and Trails Society. The area attracts retirees and tourists for its summer and winter sports.

The Columbia River flows through Castlegar. Along the river to the west are Scotties Marina and Syringa Provincial Park, with boating and camping amenities.

Sports
The city's collegiate hockey team is the Selkirk College Saints of the BCIHL, who, as of 2016, are four-time defending league champions.
The Castlegar Rebels of the KIJHL are the city's Junior "B" level hockey team.

Other local sport activities include The Castlegar Skating Club, Dancing at Turning Pointe Dance Studio and Scottie School of Highland Dance, Castlegar Aquanauts, Castlegar Minor Soccer Association, Selkirk Challengers Gymnastics Club, Castlegar Minor Hockey, West Kootenay Minor Football Association, Castlegar Sentinels Football Club, and the Kootenay Jiu Jitsu Academy. There are local baseball, lacrosse, golf, curling, tennis, volleyball and basketball programs. Many other fitness programs (including yoga) are offered at the Castlegar Community Complex.

Geography
Castlegar's main business street, Columbia Avenue, runs the length of the city. It becomes Highway 22 at its south end, and the Robson Bridge at its north end. Most of Castlegar's local businesses are located there. There are several neighbourhoods in Castlegar, including Downtown, Southridge, Oglow Subdivision, Woodland Park, Grosvenor, Kinnaird, and Blueberry Creek. The city's outskirts include the neighbourhoods of Robson, Robson West, Brilliant, Raspberry, Pass Creek, Ootischenia, Tarrys, Thrums and Genelle.

Transportation

Castlegar is a transportation hub for its region. In addition to its airport (above), it is at the junction of highways 3A, 3 and 22. Highway 22, known locally as Columbia Avenue, runs the length of the city. At its north end, Columbia meets the Robson Bridge, carrying traffic to the rural suburb of Robson, accessed via Broadwater Road.

There is a small highway interchange where the Robson Access Road meets Highway 3A towards Nelson. Highway 3 bisects Castlegar, providing the main access to the Grovesnor area, and crossing the Columbia River at the Kinnaird Bridge, to Ootischenia. Highway 3 and 3A provide routes through Ootischenia, and Highway 22 also connects to Blueberry. To the north, Highway 3A heads to Nelson. To the south, Highway 22 leads to Trail. To its east, Highway 3 leads to Salmo, and to Grand Forks to its west.

Notable residents
Felix Belczyk, former alpine skier
Earle Connor, Paralympic amputee sprinter
Travis Green, former head coach of the Vancouver Canucks
Shawn Hook, Canadian singer/songwriter
Dane Jackson, retired ice hockey player
Steve Junker, retired ice hockey player
Doug Kostynski, retired ice hockey player
Darcy Martini, retired ice hockey player

Sister cities
Enbetsu, Japan
Yueyang, China
Stephenville, Newfoundland and Labrador

Notes

References

External links

 
Cities in British Columbia
British Columbia populated places on the Columbia River